Cathrine Anne Coolahan  (née Castle; born 2 November 1929) is a retired New Zealand commercial artist, fashion illustrator, and printmaker. Her work is held in the permanent collections of the Museum of New Zealand Te Papa Tongarewa, Auckland Art Gallery Toi o Tāmaki and the British Museum.

Biography 
Coolahan was born in Sydney, Australia to Roderick Castle, a printer, and Dorothy Vera Evans, a homemaker. She attended Neutral Bay Girls Junior High School and then studied art at the East Sydney Technical College from 1945 to 1950. She graduated with honours in 1950, and went to work in the art department of Farmer & Co., a Sydney department store, where she designed brochures, wrapping paper, packaging and advertising.

In 1952 she took a three-month position in Wellington, New Zealand with advertising agency J Inglis Wright Ltd, which then became a permanent position. In 1954, Coolahan moved to rival Wellington advertising agency Carlton Carruthers du Chateau and King. One of the agency’s key clients was Lane Walker Rudkin, a Christchurch-based clothing manufacturer. Coolahan designed packaging and promotional material for the company's Canterbury label, which included clothing, lingerie, hosiery, children’s wear, and swim wear. In 1957 she left the agency due to the effects of an accident which had injured her right hand. While recuperating, she worked at the Dominion Museum as an assistant education officer.

In 1959 Coolahan returned to the advertising industry, working for James Smith Ltd, a Wellington department store, where she created a house style for the store's fashion campaigns. She worked again for Carlton Carruthers du Chateau, and then worked at James Smith part time while she taught design part time at Wellington Polytechnic. She also studied printmaking and etching under John Drawbridge and became noted for her printwork.

In 1964 she resigned from James Smith and worked as a freelance designer and tutor. Her clients included the New Zealand Broadcasting Association and NZBC Symphony Orchestra. She also painted and exhibited, including in the contemporary New Zealand painting exhibitions at the Auckland City Art Gallery in 1964 and 1965. She continued to teach design at Wellington Polytechnic until 1983.

In 1985 and 1986 a retrospective exhibition of Coolahan's work toured New Zealand.

Recognition 
In 2003 Coolahan was awarded an honorary doctorate by Massey University. She was appointed an Officer of the New Zealand Order of Merit in the 2007 Queen's Birthday Honours, for services to the arts.

Personal life 
Coolahan met her husband Max at East Sydney Technical College.

References

Australian emigrants to New Zealand
Artists from Sydney
1929 births
Living people
Officers of the New Zealand Order of Merit